Cement-bonded wood fiber is a composite material manufactured throughout the world. It is made from wood (usually waste wood), chipped into a specially graded aggregate that is then mineralized and combined with Portland cement.

Uses 

Cement-bonded wood fiber is used to manufacture a wide variety of products primarily for the construction industry (products like insulating concrete forms, siding materials and noise barriers). 

Cement bonded wood fiber materials can be classified as low density, medium density and high density. The density of the material will determine to a large extent, the various properties of the end product. Other factors determining the overall performance of a cement bonded wood fiber material are:

 Wood particle type
 Wood particle gradation
 cement to wood ratio
 Level of sugar content in the wood particle at the time of bonding

Most common is low-density cement bonded wood fiber. It is known for its use in LEED-certified projects and other types of green building. The material itself is 100% recyclable, and is known for its insulating and acoustic properties.

See Also
Wood wool

External links 
 Nexcem website
 

Composite materials
Recycled building materials
Building materials
Sustainable building
Sustainable architecture